Prince Albert is an American brand of hand-rolled-cigarette and pipe tobacco, introduced by the R.J. Reynolds Tobacco Company in 1907. It has been owned since 1987 by John Middleton Inc.

History
Prince Albert is one of the more popular independent brands of pipe tobacco in the United States; in the 1930s, it was the "second largest money-maker" for Reynolds. More recently, it has also become available in the form of pipe-tobacco cigars. (A 1960s experiment with filtered cigarettes was deemed a failure.) The blend is burley-based and remains one of America's top-selling pipe tobaccos.

The tobacco was named by R. J. Reynolds after Edward VII, who was known as Prince Albert before being crowned as the King of England. The portrait of Prince Albert was based on one acquired by Reynolds at a tea party with Mark Twain.

Prince Albert's cigars are available in packs of 5. Prince Albert's pipe tobacco is available in  pouches and  tins.

Varieties

Cigars
Prince Albert's Soft Cherry Vanilla
Prince Albert's Soft & Sweet Vanilla

Pipe tobacco
Prince Albert
Prince Albert Crimp Cut
Prince Albert Cherry Vanilla
Prince Albert Soft Vanilla Cavendish
Prince Albert Mellow

"Prince Albert in a can"
The brand is the basis of a practical joke, usually made in the form of a prank call. The prankster typically calls a store and asks if they have "Prince Albert in a can". When the unsuspecting clerk responds, "yes", (because the tobacco is typically packaged in a can, though other forms of packaging also existed), the caller follows up with, "Well, you'd better let him out!" or similar.

References 

Pipe tobacco brands
R. J. Reynolds Tobacco Company brands
Products introduced in 1907
Edward VII